Michael Malchieli (born 7 October 1982) is an Israeli politician who currently serves as the Minister of Religious Affairs and as acting Minister of Interior in the thirty-seventh government, and is a member of the Knesset for the Sephardi ultra-Orthodox Shas party.

Biography
Malchieli was a pupil at the Hebron Yeshiva, and later gained a BA in education and Israel Heritage from Bayit VeGan College and studied for a master's in public policy at the Hebrew University of Jerusalem. He taught at Boys Town Jerusalem between 2005 and 2009, and was Rosh yeshiva at the Tiferet Zvi yeshiva from 2008 until 2013.

Malchieli is married, with five children, and lives in the East Jerusalem settlement of Neve Yaakov, where he was chairman of the neighbourhood council from 2012 to 2013.

Political career
In 2013, he was elected to Jerusalem City Council, where he held the portfolio for ultra-Orthodox sports. He was also chief of staff to Minister of Religious Services David Azulai. He was placed eleventh on the Shas list for the 2015 Knesset elections. Although the party won only seven seats, he entered the Knesset on 2 November 2016 as a replacement for party leader Aryeh Deri, who resigned from the Knesset.

References

External links

1982 births
Living people
Hebrew University of Jerusalem Faculty of Social Sciences alumni
Israeli educators
Israeli Jews
Israeli Orthodox Jews
Israeli Rosh yeshivas
Israeli settlers
Jewish Israeli politicians
Ministers of Religious affairs of Israel
Members of the 20th Knesset (2015–2019)
Members of the 21st Knesset (2019)
Members of the 22nd Knesset (2019–2020)
Members of the 23rd Knesset (2020–2021)
Members of the 24th Knesset (2021–2022)
Members of the 25th Knesset (2022–)
Shas politicians